Charata is a city in the province of Chaco, Argentina.

History 
The city was founded by provincial decree on 4 October 1914.

Charata is the important settlement closest to the Campo del Cielo crater meteoric dispersion (originated by the impact of a large metallic meteoroid, probably around 3800 BCE).

References

 
 Municipality of Charata — Official website.

Populated places in Chaco Province
Cities in Argentina
Argentina